Aval Oru Sindhu is a 1989 Indian Malayalam film, directed by P. K. Krishnan. The film stars Sathaar, Kuthiravattam Pappu, Ravi Menon and Sudheer in the lead roles. The film's musical score is by Rajamani.

Cast
Sathaar
Kuthiravattam Pappu
KES Brahmakulam
Ravi Menon
Sudheer
T. G. Ravi
Jayalalita

Soundtrack
The music was composed by Rajamani and the lyrics were written by Poovachal Khader.

References

External links
 

1989 films
1980s Malayalam-language films